Rabbi Hershel Schachter (born ) is an American Orthodox rabbi, posek (religious law authority) and rosh yeshiva (dean) at Rabbi Isaac Elchanan Theological Seminary (RIETS), part of Yeshiva University (YU) in New York City.

Schachter is an halakhic (Jewish law) advisor for the Orthodox Union, and has rendered notable decisions in a number of contemporary topic areas.

Early life and education 
Hershel Schachter was born in Scranton, Pennsylvania to Melech Schachter, a rosh yeshiva (dean) at Yeshiva University (YU).

Schachter became an assistant to Joseph Ber Soloveitchik at the age of 22. He earned a B.A. from Yeshiva College and an M.A. in Hebrew literature from the Bernard Revel Graduate School of Jewish Studies in 1967. After receiving semikhah (rabbinic ordination) that year at the age of 26, Schachter became the youngest rosh yeshiva at Rabbi Isaac Elchanan Theological Seminary (RIETS), and was appointed rosh kollel (dean of the kollel) in 1971.

Schachter is a prominent posek (religious law authority). He is also a halakhic (Jewish law) advisor for the kashrut division of the Orthodox Union.

Halakhic opinions 
In the realm of medical halakha, Schachter does not allow doctors or medical students to work on Shabbat (Saturday) unless a person's life might be at risk. Schachter believes that the living status of a brain dead individual is a safek (matter of doubt), and thus requires that all decisions be made with the same stringencies applied to all cases where life-and-death is in doubt. This, ipso facto, forbids the organ donations of brain dead individuals, by considering them as possibly still halachically alive, but also requires chalitzah (release from the obligation of levirate marriage) in the case that a childless widow is left with only a brain dead husband as well as a normal brother-in-law.

In monetary law and taxation, Schachter believes that a graduated system of income taxes is "fair and reasonable" and thus falls under the ægis of dina d'malkhuta dina (law of the land is law), and thus everyone must pay taxes.

Schachter holds that a woman is not allowed to serve as the president of a synagogue unless there is absolutely no other choice. Schachter was the posek for the YU eruv in Washington Heights, Manhattan, and is one of the most notable contemporary halachic authorities to allow for the implementation of an eruv (religious enclosure) in sections of Manhattan.

He is supportive of using Tekhelet on Tzitzit and has developed his own tie which is widely used.

Other views 
In a December 2006 speech, Schachter stated that mesirah (informing on a fellow Jew to the authorities) "is permitted in situations where one is a public menace (see Shach to Choshen Mishpat 388, 59), or if one is physically or psychologically harming another individual (for example, in instances of sexual abuse of children, students, campers etc., or spousal abuse) (see Shach to Choshen Mishpat ibid, 45)."

In a February 2013 speech to a London audience, Schachter echoed this sentiment. He did express concern that before going to the authorities, one should make sure that a potential abuse victim is credible by referring him to a competent rabbi or psychologist. Schachter cited concerns that if the child's story was a fabrication, it could result in a Jew's being locked "in a cell with a shvartze, in a cell with a Muslim, a black Muslim who wants to kill all the Jews." Yeshiva University condemned the use of the term shvartze (the Yiddish word for black, racially loaded when directed at a person): "The recent use of a derogatory racial term and negative characterizations of African-Americans and Muslims, by a member of the faculty, are inappropriate, offensive, and do not represent the values and mission of Yeshiva University", a YU spokesman stated.

Schachter is endorsed by the Organization for the Resolution of Agunot, a non-profit organization that advocates for the elimination of abuse from the Jewish divorce process by, among other things, organizing public protests to compel husbands to grant their wives gittin (religious divorce documents). David Eidensohn, a Monsey, New York rabbinical judge who believes that coercing gittin renders the divorces invalid, has accused Schachter of misquoting Maimonides in public lectures to the effect that beating husbands is a valid procedure in these cases.

Works
Schachter has written many books related to Judaism. They include:

Eretz HaTzvi (1992) (with an approbation by Rabbi Dovid Lifshitz)
Nefesh HaRav (1994) - Torah from Rabbi Joseph B. Soloveitchik
B'Ikvei HaTzon (1997) (with an approbation by the famed Rabbi Pinchas Hirschsprung, the former Chief Rabbi of Montreal)
Shiurei ha-Rav ha-Gaon Rabi Yosef Dov ha-Levi Soloveitchik, Masekhet Gittin, chap. 1-4 [based on lectures from 1963-1964] (1999)
Shiurei ha-Rav ha-Gaon Rabi Yosef Dov ha-Levi Soloveitchik, Masekhet Kiddushin (2001)
MiP'ninei HaRav (2001) - more Torah from Rabbi Joseph B. Soloveitchik
Shiurei ha-Rav ha-Gaon Rabi Yosef Dov ha-Levi Soloveitchik, Tzitzet, Tefillen, Kriat haTorah (2002)
Shiurei ha-Rav ha-Gaon Rabi Yosef Dov ha-Levi Soloveitchik, Yom HaKippurim, Megillah (2002)
Shiurei ha-Rav ha-Gaon Rabi Yosef Dov ha-Levi Soloveitchik, Masekhet Shabbat (2004)
Ginas Egoz (2007) (with an approbation by Rabbi Gershon Yankelewitz)
Divrei HaRav (2010) - a third volume of Torah from Rabbi Joseph B. Soloveitchik

Articles:
 בגדר מצות קידוש והבדלה in HaDarom No. 26, Tishrei 5728 (September 1967)
 בירור הלכה בענין אמירה לנכרי בשבת וכבוד המת in HaPardes No. 57, Vol. 8 (May 1983)

Recorded shiurim:
See https://www.yutorah.org/rabbi-hershel-schachter/

He has also written more than 200 articles, in both Hebrew and English, for scholarly Torah publications such as HaPardes, HaDarom, Beit Yitzchak, and Or Hamizrach.

Works about
Lawrence Kaplan, "The Multi-Faceted Legacy of the Rav: A Critical Analysis of R. Hershel Schachter's Nefesh ha-Rav," BDD (Bekhol Derakhekha Daehu: Journal of Torah and Scholarship) 7 (Summer, 1998): 51–85.
Ferziger, Adam S. “Feminism and Heresy: The Construction of a Jewish Metanarrative.” Journal of the American Academy of Religion 77, no. 3 (2009): 494–546.

References

External links

1941 births
20th-century American male writers
20th-century American rabbis
21st-century American male writers
21st-century American rabbis
People from Washington Heights, Manhattan
Writers from Manhattan
Yeshiva University rosh yeshivas
Living people
20th-century American writers